The ROKS-2 and ROKS-3 were man-portable flamethrowers used by the USSR in the Second World War.

The ROKS-2 was designed not to draw attention, so the fuel and gas tanks were concealed under a sheet-metal outer casting resembling a knapsack; the flame projector was designed to resemble a standard Mosin–Nagant rifle. The purpose of this was to prevent the operator from being specifically targeted by the enemy. The flame shots were ignited by firing specially modified 7.62×25mm Tokarev cartridges.

The ROKS-2 was used, amongst other engagements, during the close-range fighting during the first days of the Battle of Kursk in 1943.

The ROKS-3 was a simplified model designed to be easier to manufacture. It did away with the disguise for the backpack, though it retained the flame projector designed to resemble a rifle.

The Finnish designation for captured ROKS-2 units was liekinheitin M/41-r. Captured Soviet flamethrowers saw some use by Finnish forces during the Continuation War. They were operated by two-man teams of combat engineers. They were well regarded by the Finns, although flamethrowers of all kinds saw little use by Finnish forces.

Some ROKS-3 units were supplied to North Korea, Egypt, and Syria.

See also
 List of flamethrowers
 List of Russian weaponry

References

External links

 Information on the ROKS flamethrowers
 Pictures of a ROKS-3

Flamethrowers of the Soviet Union
World War II infantry weapons of the Soviet Union
Military equipment introduced in the 1930s